The samuhanayok was one of the two chief ministers in the historical Chatusadom government system of Siam (now Thailand), originally charged with civil affairs but later overseeing both civil and military affairs in northern cities. During the Ayutthaya and Thonburi periods, the official who held the post usually took the noble title of Chakri. The term, from Sanskrit चक्री cakrī, literally meant "one who has a discus", referring to the Hindu god Vishnu who possesses the discus Sudarshana).

The last office-holder to be known by the title Chakri was Thongduang, who established the Rattanakosin Kingdom and became King Rama I in 1782. His dynasty, which includes the current Thai royal family, is known as the Chakri Dynasty after his former title. Later office-holders of Rattanakosin were granted individualized titles.

List of samuhanayok
Officials who served as samuhanayok included:

Ayutthaya

 Phraya Chakri, who served under King Mahinthrathirat and was a spy for King Bayinnaung of Burma, leading to the first fall of Ayutthaya in 1569
 Chaophraya Bowonratchanayok (Sheikh Ahmad), who served under King Songtham
 Chaophraya Chakri (Khunnen) (ขุนเณร), who served under King Sanphet IX
 Chaophraya Aphaimontri, who served under King Borommakot
 Phraya Chakri (Khrut) (ครุฑ), who served under King Borommakot

Thonburi
 Chaophraya Chakri (Mut), usually referred as Chaophraya Chakri Khaek (the 'Muslim Chaophraya Chakri'), who served under King Taksin of Thon Buri. He was a descendant of Suleiman, the sultan of Songkhla
 Chaophraya Chakri (Thongduang), who was also known by the title Somdet Chaophraya Mahakasatsuek (though sources are conflicting). He served under King Taksin, and later seized the throne, establishing Rattanakosin and becoming King Rama I.

Rattanakosin
Chaophraya Rattanaphiphit (Son): 1782–1805
Chaophraya Rattanathibet (Kun): Served under King Rama II.
Chaophraya Aphaiphuthon (Noi): Served kings Rama II and Rama III until his death in 1827.
Chaophraya Bodindecha (Sing): 1829–1849. He spent most of his term leading war campaigns, and was deputized by Phraya Sisahathep (Thongpheng).
Chaophraya Nikonbodon (To): 1851–1863
Chaophraya Phutharaphai (Nut Bunyarattaphan): 1863–1878
Prince Mahamala, who also held the title Krom Somdet Phra Bamrapporapak: 1878–1886
Chaophraya Rattanabodin (Bunrot Kanlayanamit): Held the post from 1886 until its abolition in 1892.

See also
 List of samuhakalahom
 List of prime ministers of Thailand

References

Thai nobility
Lists of political office-holders in Thailand